Sedrick A. Denson (born December 10, 1987) is an American politician who is the State Representative for the 26th District of the Ohio House of Representatives. He is a Democrat. His district consists on portions of Hamilton County, Ohio.

Ohio House of Representatives

Election
Denson was elected in the general election on November 6, 2018, winning 75 percent of the vote over 25 percent of Republican candidate Judith Boyce.

Committees
Denson serves on the following committees: Energy and Natural Resources, Ways and Means, Financial Institutions, and Public Utilities.

Election history

Personal life
Denson pleaded guilty to operating a motor vehicle while impaired in April 2019.

References

Denson, Sedrick
Living people
21st-century American politicians
1987 births
University of Cincinnati alumni
African-American state legislators in Ohio
21st-century African-American politicians
20th-century African-American people